is a city located in Okayama Prefecture, Japan. As of 2020, the city has an estimated population of 69,343 and a population density of 322 persons per km2. The total area is 211.90 km2.

History
In the 7th century, Ki Castle was built atop the mountain Kijōyama. Long in ruins, excavation and partial reconstruction began in 1999.

The city was founded on March 31, 1954.

On March 22, 2005, the villages of Yamate and Kiyone (both from Tsukubo District) were merged into Sōja.

Geography

Adjacent municipalities
Sōja is surrounded by the following cities and towns, all within Okayama Prefecture.
Okayama
Kurashiki
Ibara
Takahashi
Yakage
Kibichūō

Rivers
 Takahashi River
 Shinpon River
 Makidani River

Mountains
 Ki castle mountain
 Mount Fuku
 Mount Karube

Sister cities
Sōja has been twinned with Chino, Nagano in Japan since 1984.

References

External links

Cities in Okayama Prefecture